Titovka is a rural locality (a selo) and the administrative center of Titovsky Selsoviet of Yegoryevsky District, Altai Krai, Russia. The population was 933 as of 2016. There are 11 streets.

Geography 
Titovka is located 38 km north of Novoyegoryevskoye (the district's administrative centre) by road. Tokaryovo is the nearest rural locality.

References 

Rural localities in Yegoryevsky District, Altai Krai